Porter Lancastrian Limited is a British manufacturer of point-of-sale dispense equipment for the brewing industry.  The company sells its products under the Porta brand.
It is also a fully accredited certified ISO 9001:2015 company.

The company is located in the town of Chorley and was established in 1936.

External links
 
 Tilevision

Companies based in Chorley